Hundertmark is a surname. Notable people with the surname include:
 Bruce Hundertmark, Australian businessman
 Jean Hundertmark (born 1954), American politician
 Lothar Hundertmark,  German composer
 Rowan Hundertmark, Australian rules football umpire until 2017
  (1715–1762), German author